Biniax is a series of free and open-source puzzle video games first released in 2005. There are three games: Biniax, Biniax 2, and BiniaxMobile. All are under the zlib license, with the first two coded in C and the mobile version in Java ME.

Gameplay

The game field is a 5 x 7 grid consisting of empty spaces and pairs of coloured elements. These elements can either be blue, green, red, or yellow. Pairs of these elements cannot be of the same colour. A single element is assigned to the player, which can be moved to empty places. Pairs containing an element of the same colour as the player's element can be selected and removed from the field. Then, the score is increased, and the player's element is swapped with the other elements of the pair. The field is scrolling down on time events or after certain moves are spent (depending on the game mode). The game is over when there is no move available for the player.

Reception 
In 2008 Biniax-2 was awarded 3rd place at the Bulgarian Computer Space 2008 festival in the "Offline multimedia" category.

In 2008 a short feature of Biniax-2 in Game Tunnel stated "...it is definitely the kind of game you will want to have around for any time you have a free minute because it is so fun!".

In 2007 a Bytten review of Biniax-2 rated the game with a 70% overall score. Biniax-2 was reviewed in 2007 by the Polish Victory Games website and was awarded a silver medal.

FreeGameArchive described in 2007 Biniax mobile as: "Biniax Mobile is one of the best logical-express I've ever played on mobile phone!".

A review of Biniax-2 at PlneHry.cz in Czech in 2007 rated it 7/10.

A 2005 review on AllAboutSymbian rating BinaxMobile 75/100.

Biniax was selected in March 2016 as a "HotPick" by Linux Format.

References

External links

 
 Biniax-2 Debian repository
 Biniax for Android in Google Play

BeOS games
Dreamcast games
Linux games
Mobile games
Puzzle video games
2005 video games
Android (operating system) games
Amiga games
GP2X games
MacOS games
Multiplayer and single-player video games
Java platform games
Freeware games
Free software that uses SDL
Open-source video games
PlayStation Portable games
Video games developed in Bulgaria
Windows games